Gerlach II of Isenburg-Covern was the Count of Isenburg-Covern from 1158 until 1217.

References 

1217 deaths
House of Isenburg
Year of birth unknown